Richard William Blackwood Ker (30 November 1850 – 19 June 1942) was an Irish landowner and MP.

He was the son of David Stewart Ker and his wife, Anna Dorothea Blackwood. He was a captain in the 1st Royal Dragoons. He inherited his father's estates of Montalto and Portavo at Ballynahinch on the death of his elder brother, David Alfred Ker.

He was appointed Sheriff of County Down for 1880-81 and was the Member of Parliament for County Down, 1884–1885 and for East Down, 1885–1890.  He has been described as 'a substantial landowner from Ballynahinch.'  

He married Edith Louisa, the daughter of William Rose of Warwickshire and had at least one son, who was an officer in the army.

References

External links

 

1850 births
1942 deaths
UK MPs 1880–1885
UK MPs 1885–1886
UK MPs 1886–1892
Members of the Parliament of the United Kingdom for County Down constituencies (1801–1922)
High Sheriffs of Down
Blackwood family